Nelson Jair Cardona Ramírez (born 18 January 1969) is a Colombian prelate of the Catholic Church who has been the Bishop of San José del Guaviare since 2016.

Biography
Nelson Jair Cardona Ramírez was born in Norcasia on 18 January 1969.  He studied at the Major Seminary in Manizales; he earned a licenciate in spiritual theology at the Pontifical Gregorian University and a doctorate in theology from the Theological Pastoral Institute for Latin America (ITEPAL). He was ordained a priest of the Diocese of La Dorada-Guaduas on 12 December 1992.

His assignments have included service as Diocesan Delegate for Youth Ministry, Diocesan Delegate for Vocation Ministry, parish priest of San Antonio de Padua in La Paz, Professor and Formator of the Diocesan Major Seminary Christ Buen Pastor, priest at the Cathedral, Parish Administrator of Santísima Trinidad parish in Puerto Salgar, parish priest of San Antonio de Padua parish in Manzanares. Beguin 2005 he was Diocesan Delegate for ordained ministers. Since 2010 he has been taught at the Theological Pastoral Institute for Latin America (ITEPAL), serving as parish priest of Santísima Trinidad parish in Puerto Salgar since 2015.

On 7 May 2016, Pope Francis named him Bishop of San José del Guaviare. He received his episcopal consecration from Oscar Aníbal Salazar Gómez, Bishop of La Dorada-Guaduas, on 18 June and was installed on 9 July.

He was a participant in the Synod of Bishops for the Pan-Amazon region in 2019. He was one of four Synod prelates elected on 7 October to the thirteen-person committee to prepare the Synod's concluding document.

Notes

References
 

Living people
1969 births
Pontifical Gregorian University alumni
21st-century Roman Catholic bishops in Colombia
Roman Catholic bishops of San José del Guaviare